The following banknotes were issued for the East African shilling.

1921 issue

1933 issue

1938-52 issue

1953 issue

1958-60 issue

East Africa
Banknotes of Africa